Raquel Teixeira Lyra Lucena (born 2 December 1978) is a Brazilian lawyer, politician and the current governor of Pernambuco since 2023. Lyra was mayor of Caruaru from 2017 to 2022. A member of a political family, she previously served as a member of the Legislative Assembly of Pernambuco. She is affiliated to the Brazilian Social Democracy Party (PSDB) but was a member of the Brazilian Socialist Party (PSB).

Early career
Lyra was born to João Lyra Neto, the former mayor of Caruaru and Governor of Pernambuco, and Mércia Lyra, daughter of the former mayor of Caruaru João Lyra Filho and niece of Itamar Franco's Minister of Justice Fernando Soares Lyra.

Lyra was elected to the state legislative of Pernambuco in the 2010 elections with 49,610 votes. Lyra was reelected in 2014 with around 80,000 votes, being the most voted state representative in that election.

Lyra was elected mayor of her hometown Caruaru in 2017 with 53.15% of the vote. She is the first woman to be elected as a mayor of Caruaru.

Governor of Pernambuco 
In 31 March 2022 she resigned to the office of mayor of Caruaru in order to run in the 2022 Pernambuco gubernatorial election as a candidate. She finished the first round of the elections in the second place, with 20.58% of the valid votes, and advanced to a run-off in the second round with Marília Arraes, a member of Solidariedade. 

Raquel was elected governor of Pernambuco on 30 October 2022, after obtaining 58.70% of the valid votes in the second round and defeating Marília Arraes, who obtained 41.30% of the votes. She is the first female governor of the state of Pernambuco.

Personal life
Lyra is the daughter of former mayor of Caruaru and former Governor of Pernambuco João Lyra Neto. She is the widow of Fernando Lucena who died on the day of the first round of the 2022 Brazilian general election. She has two sons: Fernando Jr. and João.

Electoral history

2022 Pernambuco gubernatorial election

2020 Caruaru mayoral election

2016 Caruaru mayoral election

Legislative Assembly of Pernambuco

References 

|-

1978 births
Living people
People from Caruaru
Brazilian Social Democracy Party politicians
Members of the Legislative Assembly of Pernambuco
Women mayors of places in Brazil